Campeonato Brasileiro 1971 may refer to:

Campeonato Brasileiro Série A 1971
Campeonato Brasileiro Série B 1971
Campeonato Brasileiro Série C 1971

See also 
 Campeonato Brasileiro (disambiguation)